The Plaza de toros El Progreso disaster was a crowd collision tragedy that occurred about 8:30 p.m. on 31 January 1965 when in the tunnel and crew ramp of the venue, through which the people who had enjoyed the evening show of Mexican popular music were coming out and at the same time the public who would attend the night show were trying to enter.

The two crowds collided with each other, and as a consequence people were run over, causing some of them to be crushed, as others ran over them. The result was 19 people dead, and 35 injured.

Two shows had been scheduled for that Sunday, one in the evening at 5:00 p.m., and the second at night, at 8:30 p.m., to be performed at the Plaza de toros El Progreso.

See also

References 

Crowd collapses and crushes
January 1965 events
History of Jalisco
1965 disasters in Mexico
1965 in Mexico
1960s in Mexico